Carolyn R. Mobley is an inventor who patented a tab construction for a sanitary napkin in 1971.

Overview
Her idea was to add a pressure-sensitive adhesive strip near the end of the tab, covered with a fairly stiff cover strip. This stiffness makes the tab easier to thread through the clasp or grip of a sanitary belt. The woman then removes the cover strip and uses the adhesive patch to roll up the napkin for disposal.

References

Women inventors
Year of birth missing
Year of death missing